The 1991–92 Romanian Hockey League season was the 62nd season of the Romanian Hockey League. Five teams participated in the league, and Steaua Bucuresti won the championship.

Regular season

External links
hochei.net

1991–92
Romanian
Rom